Venturiocistella is a genus of fungi within the Hyphodiscaceae family. The genus contained seven species (in 2008). Then 8 species in 2022.

The genus was circumscribed by Ain Gustavovich Raitviir in Sist. Rasprostranenie Gribov vol.155. 1978 (Acad. Sci. Eston. SSR) based on an earlier description in Syll. Fung. vol.8 on page 388 in 1889 by Pier Andrea Saccardo and Lars Romell (and named Pirottaea venturioides .

The genus name of Venturiocistella is in honour of Carlo Antonio Maria Venturi (1805–1864), who was an Italian mycologist.

Species
As accepted by Species Fungorum;
 Venturiocistella diversipila 
 Venturiocistella gaylussaciae 
 Venturiocistella heterotricha 
 Venturiocistella japonica 
 Venturiocistella pini 
 Venturiocistella ulicicola 
 Venturiocistella uliginosa 
 Venturiocistella venturioides

References

External links
Venturiocistella at Index Fungorum

Hyaloscyphaceae